Oxyntes was a mythical king of Athens, son of Demophon (and therefore grandson of Theseus). He had two sons, Apheidas and Thymoetes, who succeeded him, one another, in the throne. Thymoetes was the last descendant of Theseus on the Athenian throne.

Notes

References 

 Pausanias, Description of Greece with an English Translation by W.H.S. Jones, Litt.D., and H.A. Ormerod, M.A., in 4 Volumes. Cambridge, MA, Harvard University Press; London, William Heinemann Ltd. 1918. . Online version at the Perseus Digital Library
 Pausanias, Graeciae Descriptio. 3 vols. Leipzig, Teubner. 1903.  Greek text available at the Perseus Digital Library.
 Tzetzes, John, Book of Histories, Book I translated by Ana Untila from the original Greek of T. Kiessling's edition of 1826. Online version at theio.com

Kings of Athens

Kings in Greek mythology
Attican characters in Greek mythology